Zhang Yu (born 7 May 1994) is a Chinese footballer who currently plays for China League One club Qingdao Youth Island F.C.

Club career
Zhang Yu started his professional football career in 2012 when he registered for Beijing Youth, which was the U18 team of Chinese Super League side Beijing Guoan, for 2012 China League Two. He was promoted to Beijing Guoan's first team squad in 2013. Playing for the reserved team mostly between 2013 and 2017, he eventually made his debut for the club on 11 March 2018, playing the whole match in a 2–1 away win over Jiangsu Suning. Beijing Guoan manager Roger Schmidt gave high praise of his debut.

After a spell on trial ahead of the 2020 season, Zhang Yu joined Changchun Yatai on loan for the season, presenting him with a chance to earn regular first-team football thanks to the departure of Yu Rui to Chinese Super League club Shanghai SIPG.

Career statistics
.

Honours

Club
Beijing Guoan
Chinese FA Cup: 2018

References

External links
 

1994 births
Living people
Chinese footballers
Footballers from Beijing
Beijing Guoan F.C. players
Changchun Yatai F.C. players
China League Two players
China League One players
Chinese Super League players
Association football defenders